The Halifax Regional Water Commission (HRWC), publicly known as Halifax Water, is the municipal water, wastewater and stormwater utility serving the residents of the Halifax Regional Municipality (HRM), pursuant to the Public Utilities Act. An autonomous, self-financed utility, Halifax Water is a fully metered water utility providing water, fire protection, wastewater and stormwater services as regulated by the Nova Scotia Utility and Review Board.

History
Although HRWC's present structure has existed since 1945, its creation was related to earlier events. As with any growing metropolis throughout the last century, the former City of Halifax had struggled to meet the ever-increasing demands of its residents for clean, safe drinking water. In 1861, after serious degradation, the water supply system was purchased by the City from a private company and operated in one form or another for 75 years, without ever resolving its maintenance and wastage problems.

Ravaged by two world wars and the Great Depression, by 1943, Halifax's water supply had deteriorated to a critical condition. Responding to a government-commissioned report on the need for a complete overhaul of the system, the City, on January 1, 1945, formed the Public Service Commission (renamed the Halifax Water Commission in 1987) to operate and manage the water utility.
    
Eight years later, in 1952, the Water Commission purchased the assets of the water utility outright from the City to ensure that the utility operated in a business-like manner. This business-like approach has enabled the HWC to continually improve and upgrade the water supply system by funding operational and capital expenditures directly from potable water and fire protection revenue, without any financial assistance from the municipal government.

Given a mandate to own and operate the City's water supply, the HRWC has transformed the water supply system into a modern, efficient and financially sound operation providing high quality water and service to its customers. In 1977, the Pockwock water supply system was brought on line, on time and on budget. Through sound financial planning, the debt for the Pockwock system was retired in the year 2000.

On April 1, 1996, as a result of metro amalgamation, the Dartmouth and Halifax County water utilities were merged with the Halifax Water Commission, bringing with it, new challenges and opportunities. In response to a pressing need for high quality water in the Dartmouth area, the Commission constructed a new water treatment plant at Lake Major and associated transmission system. The project was completed in December, 1998, on time and on budget with minimal disruption to HRWC's customers. The most recent exciting opportunity arose in 2013 when HRWC filed claims to the UARB for urgent and long-overdue upgrades and a 30% rate hike (11.2% in 2013 and 16.7% in 2014 for a cumulative increase of 29.8%).

On August 1, 2007, the Commission expanded its mandate once again with the transfer of HRM's wastewater and stormwater assets to Halifax Water, and becoming the first regulated water and wastewater/stormwater utility in Canada.

Water supply system 

 3 water supply plants
 J. Douglas Kline Water Supply Plant (Pockwock) was commissioned in 1977 and uses a direct dual media filtration process.  Plant capacity is 227,000,000 litres/day (50 Million igpd) and serves the communities of Halifax, Bedford, Lower Sackville, Fall River, Waverley and Timberlea.
 Lake Major Water Supply Plant was commissioned in  1999 and uses a sedimentation with multi-media filtration process.  Plant capacity is 94,000,000 litres/day (20 Million igpd) and serves the communities of  Dartmouth, Eastern Passage,  Cole Harbour and Westphal.
 Bennery Lake Water Supply Plant was commissioned in 1987 and uses a direct filtration process.  Plant capacity is 7,950,000 litres/day (1.75 Million igpd) and serves the Halifax Stanfield International Airport and Aerotech Business Park.
5 isolated systems
 Five Island Lake was commissioned in 1994 and serves Five Island Lake
 Collins Park was commissioned in 2010 and serves Wellington
 Middle Musquodoboit was commissioned in 2010 and serves Middle Musquodoboit.
 Silver Sands was acquired in 1999 and serves Cow Bay.
 Miller Lake was acquired in 2002 and serves Fall River.
 18 storage reservoirs
 over 1,500 km of distribution mains
21 pump stations
 over 8,400 fire hydrants
 over 84,000 customers

Wastewater and stormwater system

 14 wastewater treatment facilities
 167 pumping stations
 over 2,300 km of collection mains
 over 38,000 manholes
 over 24,000 catchbasins
 45 retention ponds/holding tanks
approximately 16,000 driveway culverts
 approximately 600 km of ditches
over 81,000 customers receiving wastewater service
over 100,000 customers receiving stormwater service

Sponsorship
Halifax Water is a sponsor of the 2009 ICF Canoe Sprint World Championships in  Dartmouth.

References

External links

Halifax Regional Water Commission Act

Government in Halifax, Nova Scotia
Water supply and sanitation in Canada